The 1951 Arkansas Razorbacks football team represented the University of Arkansas in the Southwest Conference (SWC) during the 1951 college football season. In their second year under head coach Otis Douglas, the Razorbacks compiled a 5–5 record (1–5 against SWC opponents), finished in sixth place in the SWC, and outscored their opponents by a combined total of 178 to 162. Dave Hanner and Pat Summerall were the team's co-captains.

Schedule

References

Arkansas
Arkansas Razorbacks football seasons
Arkansas Razorbacks football